Jay Omar Williams (born October 13, 1971) is a former American football defensive end in the National Football League (NFL) who played from 1994 to 2004. He played for the Amsterdam Admirals of NFL Europe, the Miami Dolphins, the Los Angeles / St. Louis Rams, and the Carolina Panthers.

Williamsis currently retired and works as a gun dealer. Many professional athletes are among his clients. He has been featured on ESPN's SportsCenter in a featurette about professional athletes who carry guns.

References

External links
 

1971 births
Living people
American football defensive ends
Amsterdam Admirals players
Carolina Panthers players
St. Louis Rams players
Miami Dolphins players
Wake Forest Demon Deacons football players
[[Category:Players of American football from Washington, D.C.]